Görlinger-Zentrum is the northwesternmost terminal station of Cologne Stadtbahn line 3, located in Cologne, Germany. The station lies in the Görlinger-Zentrum of the district of Bocklemünd.

The station was opened on 27 August 2018 and consists of two side platforms with together two rail tracks.

By lowering the tracks in the area of the terminal stop, a level access at sidewalk level was made possible. The new terminus was equipped with a 90-centimetre high platform for barrier-free access.

See also 
List of Cologne KVB stations

References

External links
KVB station info page 
VRS station info page 

Cologne KVB stations
Ehrenfeld, Cologne
Railway stations in Germany opened in 2018